Otiophora is a genus of moths of the family Crambidae first described by Alfred Jefferis Turner in 1908.

Species
Otiophora clavifera (Hampson, 1899)
Otiophora leucotypa (Lower, 1903)
Otiophora leucura (Lower, 1903)

References

Spilomelinae
Crambidae genera
Taxa named by Alfred Jefferis Turner